The Saskatoon Stallions, formerly known as the Saskatoon Smokin' Guns, was a minor league baseball team that played in the Prairie League in 1997. They had a record of 38-28, with Keith Smith as manager. The team's attendance for the season was 28,288.

After the Pro team had folded, local baseball builder (and current manager) Dan Asham purchased the uniforms to start a Saskatoon midget team. One year later, he moved the team into the Saskatoon Senior Baseball League (SSBL). That team has gone on to win numerous championships, including three SSBL Championships (2007, 2011, and 2012).

References

Sport in Saskatoon
Baseball teams in Saskatchewan
Defunct baseball teams in Canada
Defunct sports teams in Saskatchewan
Sports clubs disestablished in 1997
Defunct independent baseball league teams